Comberton may refer to:
Comberton, Cambridgeshire, England
Comberton, Herefordshire, England
Great Comberton, Worcestershire, England
Little Comberton, Worcestershire, England